Castle Hotel is a Grade II* listed building in the community of Ruthin, Denbighshire, Wales. It is in St Peter's Square, which is in the centre of the town. It was listed by Cadw (Reference Number 917).

The building is a 3-storey brick construction dating back to the early 18th century. It was originally a coaching inn between Chester and Holyhead, and was known as the White Lion. In 2011, it was purchased by the hotel chain J D Wetherspoon.

Notes 

Ruthin
Grade II* listed buildings in Denbighshire
Grade II* listed pubs in Wales